ThalesNano, Inc. is a company that produces products for chemists, mainly in the field of flow chemistry. Its headquarters are in Budapest, Hungary with representation in Europe, North America and Asia.
ThalesNano was spun out of ComGenex, Inc in 2002 to commercialise ComGenex’s innovations in the areas of microfluidics, mesofluidics and nanotechnology.

ThalesNano's initial offering, the H-Cubecontinuous-flow hydrogenation reactor, won an R&D 100 Award in 2005, and has since been adopted by 20 out of the 20 top pharmaceutical companies.

Since then a series of modular components have been developed by the company that expand the possibilities provided by the H-Cube, as well as developing a newer version of the initial product (called the H-Cube Pro).

The use of ThalesNano's equipment for flow chemistry is supported by a number of scientific publications.

Notes and references

External links
 

Companies based in Budapest
Chemical companies of Hungary
Nanotechnology companies
Hungarian companies established in 2002 
Chemical companies established in 2002